Wyra Reservoir is a medium irrigation project constructed across the Wyra River, a tributary of Krishna River. The reservoir is located next to the Wyra town, Khammam District, Telangana. It is one of the tourist attractions in Khammam district. This Wyra reservoir was constructed in 1930, and was inaugurated by Dr.Sarvepalli Radhakrishnan former President of India. It provides drinking water to eight mandalas around Wyra. Hundreds of hectares of land is cultivated using water from Wyra reservoir. It is also well known for its good fishing and the green hills around it. The project provides water to 17,391 acres for irrigation. The reservoir also gets water from Nagarjunasagar left canal.

See also
 Sriram Sagar Project
 Sripada Yellampalli project
 Nizam Sagar
 Kaddam Project
 Pranahita Chevella
 Alisagar lift irrigation scheme
 Sri Komaram Bheem Project
 Icchampally Project
 Lower Manair Dam
 Mid Manair Dam
 Upper Manair Dam

References

External links
 http://india-wris.nrsc.gov.in/wrpinfo/index.php?title=Wyra_Project_D02538
 http://irrigation.cgg.gov.in/dp/KhammamDistrictProfile.jsp
 http://trainingonline.gov.in/integrated-reporting/navigateReportPage.htm?sparam=28&lang=1&lbCode=5431

 
Dams on the Krishna River
Irrigation in Telangana
Khammam district
Dams in Telangana
1930 establishments in India
Dams completed in 1930
Tourist attractions in Khammam district
20th-century architecture in India